Rareș Sebastian Ispas (born 26 August 2000) is a Romanian professional footballer who plays as a defender for Sepsi OSK.

Club career

He made his Liga I debut for Sepsi OSK against Academica Clinceni on 16 July 2021.

Honours
Sepsi OSK 
Cupa României: 2021–22
Supercupa României: 2022

References

External links
 
 
 

2000 births
Living people
Sportspeople from Cluj-Napoca
Romanian footballers
Association football defenders
Romania youth international footballers
Romania under-21 international footballers
Liga I players
Liga II players
CFR Cluj players
CSM Reșița players
CS Academica Recea players
Sepsi OSK Sfântu Gheorghe players